In relational database management systems and in the particular context of an Oracle Enterprise Manager (OEM) environment, an Oracle Management Server (OMS) is a software system that functions as a middle tier between Oracle intelligent agents and Oracle management consoles.  The system may operate on multiple nodes and by default uses a schema named DBSNMP.  Through this system, database administrators may view and control their OEM domain(s).

An OMS has special links with a repository database, used for storing OEM details.

References

External links
 of Oracle Enterprise Manager - Oracle Management Server
I

Oracle software